Kyle Wade Tyler (born December 27, 1996) is an American professional baseball pitcher in the Seattle Mariners organization. He previously played in Major League Baseball (MLB) for the Los Angeles Angels and San Diego Padres.

Amateur career
Tyler attended Westmoore High School in Oklahoma City, Oklahoma, where he was named the Oklahoma Gatorade Player of the Year as a senior after going 10-0 with a 0.70 ERA and 102 strikeouts over sixty innings. After graduating, he played college baseball at the University of Oklahoma where he went 6-2 with a 2.97 ERA over  innings as a junior. Following the end of his junior year, he was selected by the Los Angeles Angels in the 20th round of the 2018 Major League Baseball draft.

Professional career

Los Angeles Angels
Tyler signed and made his professional debut with the Orem Owlz of the Rookie Advanced Pioneer League, posting a 5.11 ERA over  innings. In 2019, he played with the Burlington Bees of the Class A Midwest League and was promoted to the Inland Empire 66ers of the Class A-Advanced California League during the season. Over 25 games (18 starts) with both teams, he went 10-1 with a 2.59 ERA and 106 strikeouts. He did not play a minor league game in 2020 due to the cancellation of the minor league season caused by the COVID-19 pandemic. He began the 2021 season with the Rocket City Trash Pandas of the Double-A South and was promoted to the Salt Lake Bees of the Triple-A West in early August. Over twenty games (14 starts) between both clubs, Tyler went 6-4 with a 3.66 ERA and 92 strikeouts over 86 innings.

On August 28, 2021, the Angels selected Tyler's contract and promoted him to the major leagues. He made his MLB debut on September 5 at Angel Stadium against the Texas Rangers, throwing three scoreless innings of relief while giving up one hit and striking out two. Tyler pitched a total of  innings for the Angels in 2021, giving up four runs while both walking and striking out six.

On March 19, 2022, Tyler was designated for assignment by the Angels to make room for new signee Ryan Tepera. The Boston Red Sox claimed Tyler off waivers from the Angels on March 22. Upon being claimed, he was optioned to the Triple-A Worcester Red Sox. Two days later, the Red Sox designated Tyler for assignment to free roster space for Ralph Garza Jr. On March 26, Tyler was claimed off of waivers by the San Diego Padres. The Padres designated Tyler for assignment on April 7. The following day, he was claimed off of waivers by the Angels. On April 10, Tyler was designated for assignment by the Angels.

San Diego Padres
On April 12, 2022, Tyler was claimed off of waivers by the Padres. He was then optioned to the El Paso Chihuahuas of the Triple-A Pacific Coast League. He posted a 5.51 ERA and 1.55 WHIP in 16.1 innings pitched across 11 appearances for El Paso. He was designated for assignment by San Diego on June 6. He cleared waivers and was sent outright to El Paso on June 9.

On June 12, 2022, Tyler was selected back to the active roster. On June 14, Tyler recorded his first career win in a game against the Chicago Cubs. He came in to pitch in relief of Sean Manaea, tossing two scoreless innings and striking out one omen route to the victory.

San Francisco Giants
On July 16, 2022, Tyler signed a minor league deal with the San Francisco Giants. He made four appearances for the Triple-A Sacramento River Cats, but struggled to a 9.82 ERA with 6 strikeouts in 3.2 innings pitched. He was released on August 7.

Seattle Mariners
On February 1, 2023, Tyler signed a minor league contract with the Seattle Mariners organization.

References

External links

1996 births
Living people
Sportspeople from Oklahoma City
Baseball players from Oklahoma
Major League Baseball pitchers
Los Angeles Angels players
San Diego Padres players
Oklahoma Sooners baseball players
Orem Owlz players
Burlington Bees players
Inland Empire 66ers of San Bernardino players
Rocket City Trash Pandas players
Salt Lake Bees players
Anchorage Glacier Pilots players